Alexander Murray may refer to:

Public figures

Scotland 
Earl of Dunmore
 Alexander Murray, 6th Earl of Dunmore (1804–1845)
 Alexander Murray, 8th Earl of Dunmore (1872–1962), Scottish soldier, politician and Victoria Cross recipient
Lord Elibank
 Alexander Murray, 4th Lord Elibank (1677–1736)
 Alexander Murray, 7th Lord Elibank (1747–1820), Scottish peer
 Alexander Murray, 8th Lord Elibank (1780–1830)
 Alexander Oliphant-Murray, 9th Lord Elibank  (1804–1871)
 Alexander Murray of Drumdewan (died 1599), Scottish soldier
 Alexander Murray of Elibank (1712–1778), Scottish Jacobite, fourth son of Alexander Murray, 4th Lord Elibank
 Alexander Murray, 1st Baron Murray of Elibank (1870–1920), Scottish nobleman and Liberal politician
 Alexander Murray (knight), Lord of Culbin and Newton
 Alexander Murray, Lord Henderland (1736–1795), Scottish judge and politician
 Sir Alexander Murray, 3rd Baronet (died 1743), Scottish politician, MP for Peeblesshire 1710–13
 Alexander Murray (1789–1845), Scottish politician, MP for Kirkcudbright Stewartry 1838–45
 Alexander Murray (died 1750), Scottish politician

Canada 
Alexander Murray (British Army officer, died 1762) (c. 1715–1762)
 Alexander Murray (Manitoba politician) (1839–1913), Canadian politician in the province of Manitoba
 Alexander Clark Murray (politician) (1900–1983), Canadian Member of Parliament for Oxford

Australia 
 Alexander Murray (manufacturer) (1803–1880), manufacturer of biscuits and jam; South Australian politician
 Alexander Borthwick Murray (1816–1903), South Australian sheep breeder and parliamentarian

United States 
Alexander Murray (1755–1821), U.S. Navy officer, Revolutionary War
Alexander Murray (1816–1884), U.S. Navy officer, Mexican-American and American Civil Wars
Alexander C. Murray, American mayor of Fall River, Massachusetts

Others
Alexander Murray (geologist) (1810–1884), Scottish geologist
Alexander Murray (linguist) (1775–1813), Scottish linguist and professor of Oriental languages at the University of Edinburgh
Alexander Hunter Murray (died 1874/9–1874), Hudson's Bay Company fur trader and artist
Alexander Stuart Murray (1841–1904), archaeologist
 Alexander Robertson Murray (1872–1956), president of the Bengal Chamber of Commerce
Alex Murray, a character in Madeleine L'Engle's novel A Wrinkle in Time

See also
 Alex Murray (disambiguation)